is a Japanese record label established as Crown Records on 6 September 1963. It is a spin-off of Nippon Columbia and is owned by karaoke maker Daiichikosho. The record label singles which topped the Oricon Singles Chart are Kaze's "22-Sai no Wakare" (1975), and Gackt's "Returner (Yami no Shūen)" (2007).

Artists
Artists signed to Nippon Crown Music include:
 Band-Maid (on sublabel Revolver Records) (until 2020)
 Bis (on sublabel Revolver Records)
 BRADIO
 Date of Birth(Dob) (on sublabel Hasin Music)
 Mao Denda
 Gackt
 Hanaboy
 Haruomi Hosono
 Tomomi Kasai
 Kimeru
 Saburō Kitajima
 Metis
 mizca
 Man with a Mission
 Lovely Doll
 Nightmare
 Mayo Okamoto
 Paradisio
 Predia (on sublabel Revolver Records)
 Psycho le Cému
 Seo In-guk
 Unchain (on sublabel Revolver Records)
 Vidoll
 Zigzo (on sublabel Crown Stones)

See also
List of record labels
Daiichi Kosho Company
Nippon Columbia
Mitsubishi Electric (Nippon Crown's former shareholder)

References

External links
 日本クラウン株式会社 Official Website
Nippon Crown at discogs.com

Japanese record labels
Record labels established in 1963
IFPI members
1963 establishments in Japan